Clathrus bicolumnatus is a species of fungus in the stinkhorn family. It is known only from Japan.

Species has been reclassified as Laternea columnata.

References

Phallales
Fungi of Asia
Fungi described in 1931
Taxa named by Curtis Gates Lloyd